Eduard Grüneisen (26 May 1877 – 5 April 1949) was a German physicist and the co-eponym of Mie–Grüneisen equation of state.

Grüneisen was born in Giebichenstein, near Halle (Saale).

The Grüneisen parameter was named after him.

Since 1929 he was together with Max Planck editor of Annalen der Physik.

In 1933 Grüneisen signed the Vow of allegiance of the Professors of the German Universities and High-Schools to Adolf Hitler and the National Socialistic State.

Grüneisen died in Marburg, West Germany.

References

1877 births
1949 deaths
20th-century German physicists